Rear-Admiral Norman Waldron "Wally" Fox-Decent  (July 22, 1937 – September 5, 2019) was a Canadian professor, mediator and advisor on constitutional issues and labour relations.

Born in Winnipeg, Manitoba, he received a Bachelor of Arts in political science in 1959 and a Master of Arts in 1971 from the University of Manitoba. From 1962 to 1995, he was professor of political studies at the University of Manitoba.

From 1987 to 1990, he was Chief of Reserves and Cadets for the Canadian Forces. He retired in 1996 with the rank of rear admiral.

In 1989 Fox-Decent chaired the Manitoba Task Force on the Meech Lake Accord. The committee, struck by Premier Gary Filmon and made up of Members of the Legislative Assembly from all three parties, accepted briefs and heard testimony regarding Manitobans' thoughts on the Accord, a constitutional amendment package debated from 1987-1990.

From 1992 to 2005, he was chairman of the Workers Compensation Board of Manitoba.

In 1997, he was made a Member of the Order of Canada. In 2003, he was awarded the Order of Manitoba. He died in Montreal on September 5, 2019.

Awards and decorations
Fox-Decent's personal awards and decorations included the following:

width=125

100px

110px

References

1937 births
Canadian admirals
Canadian political scientists
Members of the Order of Canada
Members of the Order of Manitoba
University of Manitoba alumni
Academic staff of the University of Manitoba
People from Winnipeg
2019 deaths
Canadian military personnel from Manitoba